Leafing Pagoda Music Ceremony  ( 雷峰夕照音乐大典 ) is a work for music ceremony,
composed and directed by He Xuntian.

1300 performers made a debut of it on 25 October 2002 in Hangzhou.

Summary 
Leifeng Pagoda Music Ceremony has ten movements: Cloud Bells; Paramita; Song of the Enlightenment; Song of Pipa; Monks; Heart Sutra; Earth Drums; Dance of the White Snake; Spring Song; Moons upon a Thousand River.

First performance
Leifeng Pagoda Music Ceremony 
Director He Xuntian
Composer He Xuntian
1300 performers
25 October 2002, Leifeng Pagoda in Hangzhou, China

References

External links

Compositions by He Xuntian
2002 compositions